The River Almond is a river in Lothian, Scotland.  It is approximately 28 miles (45 km) long, rising at Hirst Hill in Lanarkshire near Shotts, running through West Lothian and draining into the Firth of Forth at Cramond, Edinburgh. The name Almond/Amon is simply old Celtic for "river".

Environment

Running through areas that were dominated for much of the 20th century by heavy industry and shale- and coal mining, the River Almond has long been notorious for its high levels of pollution. With the demise of mining and heavy industry in Central Scotland, the river became cleaner, and it is being actively repopulated by wildlife: there is a healthy population of brown trout and there are improving runs of both Atlantic salmon (Salmo salar) and sea trout (Salmo trutta). There is also a good array of birds to be seen around the river banks, including dippers, kingfishers and grey herons, and increasing numbers of otters are being reported. The river is still the primary means by which southern West Lothian's wastewater is transported to the sea. Although the introduction of a number of water treatment plants have helped to mitigate the river’s pollution, it still suffers from high levels of detergent pollution and run-off from agricultural land. This has caused it to often have what has been described as a distinct "chemical odour". This odour is most noticeable in the part of the river that runs through Almondell and Calderwood Country Park, where there is a major outfall from the nearby East Calder treatment plant. Fishing on the lower Almond is leased from the Crown Estate by Cramond Angling Club, with both Day and Season Tickets available. The mouth of the Almond at Cramond formerly had a small passenger ferry. In 1997, the ferryman discovered the Cramond Lioness, a Roman-era sculpture, in the mud of the river bed. The sculpture is now in the Museum of Scotland in Edinburgh.

River route

The river begins its journey at Hirst Hill near Shotts Lanarkshire and runs past Seafield towards Kirkton and then through the centre of Livingston before travelling through Almondell and Calderwood Country Park where it picks up the Calder and Murieston waters. It then passes over a weir which supplies a feeder culvert which carries water into the Union Canal. Due to the height difference where the river passes under the canal, this feeder must run eastwards for several miles before reaching the canal. By following paths through the country park and along private land to the east, it is possible to follow the river and feeder all the way to the Union Canal. The river then flows east under the Almond Aqueduct of the Union Canal before turning northwards towards the Firth of Forth. It then flows past Kirkliston and Cramond, before joining the Firth of Forth near Cramond Island.

Riverside landmarks
Illieston Castle is on the river, near the Almond Aqueduct. The Stewart kings James II and James IV are said to have had a hunting lodge at Illieston. The present three-storey house is probably of late 16th century or early 17th century date. It was purchased by John Ellis, an advocate in Edinburgh, around 1663. He added a Renaissance gateway inscribed with his initials and the date 1665. Later it became the property of the Earl of Hopetoun. It is now a private house.

The industrial heritage of central Scotland can be observed along the length of the river with numerous weirs, remains of mills and other riverside industries of the past.

References

External links
 "Overview of Almond, River", Gazetteer of Scotland, accessed November 20, 2009.
 "Cramond Angling Club"
 "Forth District Salmon Fishery Board"
 "River Forth Fisheries Trust"

Almond
Almond
Almond